René Metz (born 18 December 1950) is a French sprinter. He competed in the men's 200 metres at the 1972 Summer Olympics.

References

1950 births
Living people
Athletes (track and field) at the 1972 Summer Olympics
French male sprinters
Olympic athletes of France
Mediterranean Games gold medalists for France
Mediterranean Games bronze medalists for France
Mediterranean Games medalists in athletics
Athletes from Paris
Athletes (track and field) at the 1975 Mediterranean Games
20th-century French people
21st-century French people